Kelly Merrick (née Richards;  born 1975) is an American politician from Alaska. A Republican, she was a member of the Alaska House of Representatives, representing District 14 from 2019 to 2023. In 2022, Merrick was elected to the Alaska State Senate representing District L, she was succeeded in the Alaska House by Independent Alyse Galvin. She took office as State Senator on January, 17, 2023.

Early life and career
Merrick worked as a staffer in the Alaska Legislature and served an aide  (Secretary) to U.S. Rep. Don Young for 6 months.

Political career
Merrick ran for election to the Alaska House to succeed Lora Reinbold, who ran for the Alaska Senate. Merrick defeated Jamie Allard and Eugene Harnett in a 3-way race of the Republican primary and nonpartisan Joe Hackenmueller in the general election. Rep Merrick was censured by Republican District 14 for caucusing with the Democrats in 2021.  The Alaska Republican State Central Committee also voted to censure Merrick and no longer recognizes Merrick as a Republican.

References

1975 births
21st-century American politicians
21st-century American women politicians
Date of birth missing (living people)
Living people
Republican Party members of the Alaska House of Representatives
People from Anchorage, Alaska
People from Juneau, Alaska
Women state legislators in Alaska